Glenea wallacei is a species of beetle in the family Cerambycidae. It was described by Charles Joseph Gahan in 1897. It is known from Borneo.

References

wallacei
Beetles described in 1897